The Robonic Stooges is a Saturday morning animated series featuring the characters of The Three Stooges in new roles as clumsy crime-fighting cyborg superheroes. It was developed by Norman Maurer and produced by Hanna-Barbera Productions from September 10, 1977, to March 18, 1978, on CBS and contained two segments: The Robonic Stooges and Woofer & Wimper, Dog Detectives.

The Robonic Stooges originally aired as a segment on The Skatebirds from September 10, 1977, to January 21, 1978, on CBS. When CBS canceled The Skatebirds in early 1978, the trio was given their own half-hour timeslot which ran for 16 episodes. This was the second animated series starring the Stooges, following the 1965 series The New 3 Stooges.

In 2021, it was announced The Robonic Stooges would become a comic book series with new stories published by American Mythology Productions. Issue #1 was written by S.A. Check and Jordan Gershowitz with interior art from Philip Murphy and Jorge Pacheco and main cover art by Eric Shanower.

Overview
Moe, Larry and Curly are junkyard-based superheroes who fight crime with their often malfunctioning bionic powers and are given assignments via film projector from their frustrated boss Agent 000 (pronounced "oh-oh-oh") who runs the Superhero Employment Agency.

Since all of the original Three Stooges had died when production began (Moe Howard and Larry Fine had both died in 1975, Shemp Howard died in 1955 and Curly Howard died in 1952), other voice actors were used to impersonate them, mostly veteran voice actors from other Hanna-Barbera productions. Paul Winchell voiced Moe, Joe Baker voiced Larry, and Frank Welker voiced Curly (Welker had previously used his Curly impression for the titular character in Jabberjaw). Unlike cartoon series produced by Hanna-Barbera in the 1970s, The Robonic Stooges did not contain a laugh track.

This was the second animated adaptation of the Three Stooges, the first being Cambria Studios' The New 3 Stooges in 1965, which used the actual Stooges' voices. Norman Maurer, who was married to Moe Howard's daughter and had acted as the Stooges' agent during their lifetimes, worked on both series. The Stooges had previously appeared in another Hanna Barbera-created series: The New Scooby-Doo Movies (1972), this time as Moe, Larry and Curly Joe.  With the deaths of Fine and Howard in 1975, other actors were engaged to voice the roles of Moe and Larry; neither of the surviving "third" Stooges, Joe Besser or Joe DeRita, was asked to participate (even though Besser was working for Hanna-Barbera for other series at the time).

The Robonic Stooges episodes were occasionally seen between shows as interstitial segments on Boomerang.

Voices
 Joe Baker — Larry
 Ross Martin — Agent 000, Count von Crankenstein, Blackbeard
 Frank Welker — Curly, Narrator, Ludwig Lillyput
 Paul Winchell — Moe, Mummy/Amazing Bordoni, Professor Octane

Additional voices
 Henry Corden - Hercules, Pierre Le Sly
 Scatman Crothers - King
 Casey Kasem - Atlantean Scientist
 John Stephenson - Achilles the Heel, Cardinal Poreleau, Genie, Poodleman

Episodes

The Skatebirds (1977)

The Three Robonic Stooges (1978)

References

External links
 
 The Robonic Stooges at The Big Cartoon DataBase
 Three [sic] Robonic Stooges at Don Markstein's Toonopedia. Archived from the original on January 24, 2017.

1977 American television series debuts
1978 American television series endings
1970s American animated television series
American children's animated comedy television series
American children's animated superhero television series
Television series by Hanna-Barbera
Cultural depictions of The Three Stooges
Robot superheroes
CBS original programming
Animation based on real people
American animated television spin-offs